The RWB Ladies Cup (formerly known as the O1 Properties Ladies Cup) is a tournament for professional female tennis players played on indoor hard courts. The event is classified as a $25,000 ITF Women's Circuit tournament and has been held in Khimki, Russia, annually, since 2016. The event was held as a $100,000 tournament in 2018, but downgraded the following year to a $25,000 tournament.

Past finals

Singles

Doubles

External links 
 ITF search
 Official website

ITF Women's World Tennis Tour
Hard court tennis tournaments
Tennis tournaments in Russia
Recurring sporting events established in 2016
2016 establishments in Russia